The Sanaga River (formerly ) is the largest river in Cameroon  located in East Region, Centre Region and Littoral Region. Djerem is the longest source of Sanaga River with a total length of 464.5 km.

Course 
The Sanaga River has its Source at the Adamawa Plateau. It is formed by the confluence of the Djérem River and Lom River in the north of the East Region.

Climate 
The Sanaga River forms a boundary between two tropical moist forest ecoregions. The Cross-Sanaga-Bioko coastal forests lie to the north between the Sanaga River and the Cross River of Nigeria, and the Atlantic Equatorial coastal forests extend south of the river through southwestern Cameroon and Equatorial Guinea, Gabon, the Republic of the Congo, Cabinda and the Democratic Republic of the Congo.

Hydrology 
The flow of the river was measured at Edéa in m³/s

Dams and reservoirs 
Beginning at the headwaters, there are 2 dams on the Sanaga River:

Transport

The Camrail railway bridges the Sanaga River at Edea.

References

Further reading

Rivers of Cameroon